Mitogen-activated protein kinase 6 is an enzyme that in humans is encoded by the MAPK6 gene.

The protein encoded by this gene is a member of the Ser/Thr protein kinase family, and is most closely related to mitogen-activated protein kinases (MAP kinases). MAP kinases, also known as extracellular signal-regulated kinases (ERKs), are activated through protein phosphorylation cascades and act as integration points for multiple biochemical signals. This kinase is localized in the nucleus, and has been reported to be activated in fibroblasts upon treatment with serum or phorbol esters.

Discovery 

ERK3/MAPK6 was initially cloned from the rat brain cDNA library by homology screening with probes ERK1 derived probe.

Gene location 

In humans, MAPK 6 gene  is located on the distal arm of chromosome 15 (15q21.2). It is 47.01kb long and is transcribed in the centromere to telomere orientation. It consist of 6 exons with the translation initiation codon which is located in exon2.

Structure 

It is an atypical member of the mitogen activated kinases family. The molecular mass of the translated protein is approximately 100kDa, and is made up of 721 amino acid residues. It contains a typical kinase domain at the N- terminal and an extended C- terminal. The first 150 residues at c- terminal are 50% similar to ERK4 protein. At the kinase domain it exhibits about 70% similarity with the ERK4 protein. The activation loop of the phosphorylation motif contains only one phospho acceptor site (Ser-Glu-Gly).

The structure is predicted by homology modelling using the crystal structure of phoshphorylated ERK2. According to the model, the structure of ERK3/MAPK6 kinase domain resembles other MAP kinases.  The modelled ERK3/MAPK6 kinase domain is predicted to fold with a topology similar to other MAP kinases.

Expression 

ERK3/MAPK6 is widely expressed protein however it is expressed in significantly higher amounts in skeletal muscles and brain. It is localized in cytoplasm and the nucleus of cells. ERK3/MAPK6 is a highly unstable protein and has a very little half life of less than an hour. It is degraded by ubiquitin mediated proteasomal pathway.

Function 
It is very important for neonatal growth and survival. ERK3/MAPK6 forms a complex with microtubule associated protein2 (MAP2) and MAPKAPK5 which mediates the phosphorylation of MAPKAPK5 which in turn phosphorylates ERK3/MAPK6 at serine 189 residue mediating the entry into cell cycle. It also acts as a regulator for T- cell development. The  catalytic  activity of ERK3/MAPK6 plays an important for the proper differentiation of T-cells in the thymus. The long c- terminal is responsible for thymic differentiation.

Role in cancer 
ERK3/MAPK6  interacts with and phosphorylated steroid receptor coactivator 3 (SRC-3) This coreceptor   is an oncogenic protein which when overexpressed at serine 857 leads to cancer. After the phosphorylation of  SRC-3 results in the upregulation of  MMP activity ERK3-mediated phosphorylation at S857 was essential for interaction of SRC-3 with the ETS transcription factor PEA3, which promotes upregulation of MMP gene expression and proinvasive activity.

References

Further reading

External links 
 MAP Kinase Resource  .

EC 2.7.11